Xavier Pérez Font (born 15 January 1968) is an Andorran former cyclist. He competed at the 1988 Summer Olympics and the 1992 Summer Olympics. He also rode in the 1993 Giro d'Italia, but failed to finish.

References

External links
 

1968 births
Living people
Andorran male cyclists
Olympic cyclists of Andorra
Cyclists at the 1988 Summer Olympics
Cyclists at the 1992 Summer Olympics
People from Escaldes-Engordany